Brave Bird was an American emo band from Ann Arbor, Michigan.

History
Brave Bird began in 2011 with the release of a split with the band Pity Sex. In 2012, Brave Bird signed to Count Your Lucky Stars Records. In 2013, Brave Bird released their first and only full-length album titled Maybe You, No One Else Worth It on Count Your Lucky Stars Records. In 2014, Brave Bird released a 10" titled T Minus Grand Gesture on Count Your Lucky Stars Records.

Discography
Studio albums
Maybe You, No One Else Worth It (2013, Count Your Lucky Stars)

EPs
Brave Bird/Pity Sex – Split (2011, self-released)
T Minus Grand Gesture (2014, Count Your Lucky Stars)

References

Musical groups from Michigan
American emo musical groups
Musical groups established in 2011
2011 establishments in Michigan
Count Your Lucky Stars Records artists